Kilian Corredor (born 4 November 2000) is a French professional footballer who plays as a forward for Rodez.

Career
A youth product of Rodez, Corredor moved to the academy of Toulouse in 2017. In the summer of 2021, he left Toulouse's reserve team and joined Rodez as a senior player. He made his professional debut with Sochaux in a 1–0 Ligue 2 loss to Auxerre on 21 September 2021.

Personal life
Corredor's father, Grégory Corredor, was a semi-pro footballer who also played for Rodez AF.

References

External links
 

2000 births
Living people
Footballers from Montpellier
French footballers
Association football forwards
Rodez AF players
Ligue 2 players
Championnat National 3 players